The Hon. Francis Grosvenor Hood (1809–1855) was an English army officer in the British Army, rising to the rank of lieutenant-colonel of the Grenadier Guards. He led, as major, the 3rd Battalion of Grenadiers at the Battle of the Alma in 1854. He was killed in the trenches before Sebastopol in 1855.

Origins 
Francis Grosvenor Hood, born on 4 March 1809, was the second son of Lieutenant-colonel Francis Wheler Hood, son of Henry, 2nd Viscount Hood, and grandson of Samuel, 1st Viscount. His mother was Caroline (died 11 March 1858), only daughter of Sir Andrew Snape Hamond. His father was killed when in his thirty-third year, on the heights of Aire, on 2 March 1814, and was, in the words of Wellington, "an officer of great promise and merit".

Career 
Francis joined the Grenadier Guards in 1827, was promoted to his lieutenancy and captaincy in 1830, became captain and lieutenant-colonel on 31 December 1841, and on 27 June 1854 was gazetted major of the 3rd Battalion of the Grenadiers. 

Hood proceeded with the 3rd Battalion to the Crimea, and led it at the Battle of the Alma on 20 September 1854, when his conspicuous gallantry and judgment contributed most effectively to the defeat of the Russian counter-attack, and he received the special thanks of the commander-in-chief. 

On 18 October 1855 Hood was in command of the covering party guarding the trenches and guns before Sebastopol, and was shot dead while taking an observation. Prince Edward of Saxe-Weimar, a fellow officer of the Grenadier Guards, wrote of his commander, "He was looking out of an embrasure when a round-shot caught him in the side. He died almost immediately—died as a soldier, as did his father before him. He is a very great loss to us." Lord Raglan, in his despatch of 23 October, described Hood as an excellent officer, and wrote that he was "deeply lamented".

Personal life 
Hood married in 1842 his first cousin, Elizabeth Jane, second daughter of Sir Graham Eden Hamond, but had no issue.

Gallery

Notes

References

Sources 

 
 Burke, Bernard (1865). A Genealogical and Heraldic Dictionary of the Peerage and Baronetage of the British Empire. 27th ed. London: Harrison. p. 587.
 Gurwood, John, ed. (1834). The Dispatches of Field Marshal the Duke of Wellington. Vol. 11. London: John Murray. p. 548.
 Kinglake, A. W. (1877). The Invasion of the Crimea. 6th ed. Vol. 3. Edinburgh and London: William Blackwood and Sons. pp. 220–222, 239.
 Kinglake, A. W. (1877). The Invasion of the Crimea. 6th ed. Vol. 4. Edinburgh and London: William Blackwood and Sons. p. 442.
 The Gentleman's Magazine. Vol. 84, Part 1. January–June 1814. London: Nichols, Son, and Bentley. pp. 413, 492.
 The Gentleman's Magazine. Vol. 198, Part 1. January–June 1855. London: John Bowyer Nichols and Sons. pp. 83–84.

Attribution:

Further reading 

 Boase, Frederic (1892). "Hood, Francis Grosvenor". Modern English Biography. Vol. 1. Truro: Netherton and Worth. p. 1524.
 Hamilton, F. W. (1874). The Origin and History of the First or Grenadier Guards. Vol. 3. London: John Murray. p. 206.
 Harris, Henry (1971). The Alma 1854. London: Charles Knight.

1809 births
1855 deaths
British military personnel of the Crimean War
British Army officers
Grenadier Guards officers